Andrew A. Kosove is an American film and television producer who has produced 35 films.  He was nominated for an Academy Award for the film The Blind Side. Alongside his producing partner, Broderick Johnson, he is the co-founder and co-CEO of Alcon Entertainment, a Los Angeles-based wholly independent film and television production and financing company.  In addition to his career in the entertainment industry, Kosove is also an accomplished and avid marathon runner and triathlete.   He finished third in the Ironman Executive Challenge in Ironman Coeur d'Alene in 2010.   He competed and finished the Ironman World Championship in Kona, Hawaii in 2012.

Early life
Kosove graduated from Princeton University in 1992. He became friends with Broderick Johnson in college. He is of Jewish descent.

Career
Kosove and Johnson moved to Los Angeles, California, where they started a film production company with financial capital from Frederick W. Smith, the founder and chairman of FedEx. The company became known as Alcon Entertainment. Their first feature film, Lost & Found, had limited box office returns, but their second film, My Dog Skip, cost only $7M to produce and grossed $34 million domestically. Alcon's other productions include P.S. I Love You, Dude, Where's My Car?, The Sisterhood of the Traveling Pants, The Book of Eli, Insomnia (the first studio distributed film for director Christopher Nolan), and Denis Villeneuve's Prisoners.

In 2009, Kosove and Johnson produced Alcon's The Blind Side, which became the highest grossing sports film of all time. The film was nominated for a Best Picture Oscar and earned Sandra Bullock the Academy Award for Best Actress. The following year, Alcon Entertainment produced and financed Dolphin Tale, another modestly budgeted family film that earned an A+ Cinemascore from audiences, and grossed $100M in worldwide box-office.

Kosove was nominated for an Emmy Award as an executive producer on the documentary entitled, Sinatra: All or Nothing At All (directed by Alex Gibney) in 2015.  He is also the Executive Producer of the highly acclaimed Sci-fi series, The Expanse.

Personal life
Kosove lives in Los Angeles and is married to producer Kira Davis. They have two children together.

Filmography

Film

Television
Executive producer
 Hysteria (2014)
 Sinatra: All or Nothing at All (2015) (Documentary)
 Everest (2015)
 The Expanse (2015−22)
 The Defiant Ones (2017) (Documentary)
 Pete the Cat (2017−20)
 Nana (2019) (TV movie)
 Blade Runner: Black Lotus (2021)

References

External links
 

Living people
Year of birth missing (living people)
People from Los Angeles
Princeton University alumni
Film producers from California
American independent film production company founders